Deborah Cox is the debut album by Canadian singer Deborah Cox. It was released by Arista Records on  September 12, 1995 in the United States. Executive produced by Clive Davis, Deborah Cox is a blend of R&B, soul and hip hop soul and features productions from producers such as Tim & Bob, Babyface, Daryl Simmons and Dallas Austin. A commercial and critical success, the album was certified Gold by the Recording Industry Association of America (RIAA), for sales of over 500,000 units, and earned Cox a Juno Award for Best R&B/Soul Recording at the 1996 Juno Awards.

"Sentimental" was released as the lead single from the album, and peaked at number 27 on the US Billboard Hot 100 and number 4 on the Hot R&B/Hip-Hop Songs chart. The second single "Who Do U Love" fared better on the singles chart, peaking at number 17 on the Hot 100, while reaching the top of Billboards Hot Dance Club Songs, selling 500,000 copies domestically. It also attained worldwide success, peaking at number two on the New Zealand Singles Chart and reaching the Top 20 on other international charts.

Critical reception

AllMusic editor Stephen Thomas Erlewine found that Cox "is a confident and stylish singer, but her self-titled debut is helped by considerably by the powerhouse producers work behind the scenes [...] The record is filled with immaculately crafted dance-pop and ballads. Not all of the songs are up to the production standards, however. Like many singers in her genre, Deborah Cox is only as good as her material, and the songs on their debut are uneven [...] Nevertheless, the best songs on the album suggests that Cox has the potential to develop into a star."

Track listing

2012 re-release
In 2012, the album was remastered and re-released in the UK by New Skool Sounds as a 2CD deluxe edition with 16 additional tracks.

Charts

Certifications

References

External links
 

1995 debut albums
Deborah Cox albums
Arista Records albums
Albums produced by Dallas Austin
Albums produced by Vincent Herbert
Albums produced by Tim & Bob
Albums produced by Babyface (musician)
Juno Award for R&B/Soul Recording of the Year recordings